Ramesh Bhatia (born 4 July 1940) is an Indian former cricketer. He played eighteen first-class matches for Bengal between 1961 and 1972.

See also
 List of Bengal cricketers

References

External links
 

1940 births
Living people
Indian cricketers
Bengal cricketers
People from Dera Ismail Khan District